Sir Hugh Beeston (c. 1547 – February 1626) was an English politician who sat in the House of Commons at various times between 1589 and 1614.

Beeston was the second son of Sir George Beeston of Beeston and his first wife. Sir George baptised both his two eldest sons Hugh which leads to confusion. Hugh Beeston was awarded BA at Oxford University in 1563 and entered Lincoln's Inn in 1565. This is taken to be the younger Hugh who was deputy comptroller for Cheshire and Flintshire in 1585 and in 1589. It is likely that he was  also the Member of Parliament for several constituencies that were open to court influence. In 1589, he was elected Member of Parliament for Bodmin.  He was J.P. for Cheshire from about 1592. In 1593 he was elected MP for West Looe  in 1593. 

John Chamberlain mentioned that Hugh Beeston was involved in a fight with a Cheshire man called Sutton soon after the funeral of his father in 1601.
 
Beeston was granted the estate of Plas Cadwgan, Denbighshire after its owner, Edward Jones, was executed for involvement in the Babington plot, and it became his main residence. By April 1595 he was receiver general of the revenue in the Exchequer for Cheshire and North Wales. He became JP for Denbighshire in 1596. In 1597 he was elected MP for Knaresborough  and in 1601 he was elected MP for Winchelsea. He was knighted in 1603. In 1604 he was elected MP for New Shoreham. He succeeded to the estates of Beeston on the death of his brother in 1608. In 1614 he was elected MP for Liverpool.

Beeston died at the age of about 78. He had married Margaret Worth, widow of Philip Worth of Titherington and daughter of Roger Downes. They had two sons and a daughter.

References

 
 

 

1547 births
1626 deaths
Members of the pre-1707 English Parliament for constituencies in Cornwall
Alumni of the University of Oxford
Year of birth uncertain
Members of the Parliament of England (pre-1707) for Liverpool
English MPs 1589
English MPs 1593
English MPs 1597–1598
English MPs 1604–1611
English MPs 1614